Ashton Nicole Casey (born February 19, 1996), known professionally as Ashnikko, is an American singer, rapper, and songwriter. She rose to prominence with her 2019 single "Stupid" with (Yung) Baby Tate, which gained viral popularity on the video-sharing platform TikTok and was certified gold in the United States and Canada. Ashnikko's debut mixtape, Demidevil, was released in January 2021, and spawned the singles "Daisy" and "Slumber Party" featuring Princess Nokia.

Early life 
Ashton Nicole Casey was born on February 19, 1996, in Oak Ridge, North Carolina, and raised in the city of Greensboro. Her parents exposed her to diverse musical genres, such as country music and Slipknot. She recalls becoming interested in music, specifically rap music, when she listened to Arular by M.I.A. at the age of 10, and did not listen to male musicians until she was 16 years old. As a teenager, her family moved to Estonia for her father's studies, spending a year there before relocating again to Riga, Latvia. At one point, she was the only American in Latvia to attend a Latvian public high school. At the age of 18, Casey moved to London by herself.

Career

2016–2019: Career beginnings and Hi It's Me 
Ashnikko's first song, "Krokodil", was produced by Raf Riley and published to SoundCloud in July 2016. She released her first EP, Sass Pancakes, under Digital Picnic Records in 2017. The EP was produced by Raf Riley and features appearances from Avelino. Ashnikko's second EP, Unlikeable, was released in November 2018. The EP spawned the singles "Blow", "Nice Girl", "Invitation" featuring Kodie Shane, and "No Brainer".

Ashnikko released her third EP, Hi It's Me, in July 2019. The EP was preceded by the promotional single "Special" and was launched alongside the EP's title track and lead single, "Hi It's Me". The second official single, "Stupid", featuring Yung Baby Tate, gained viral popularity on the video-sharing platform TikTok. The song reached number one on the Billboard Bubbling Under Hot 100 chart, the Billboard Bubbling Under R&B/Hip-Hop chart, and the Spotify Viral 50 chart. "Stupid" was also certified gold in the United States in August 2020, as well as in Canada. Another song from the EP, "Working Bitch", also found popularity on TikTok. Ashnikko embarked on a North American tour supporting American rapper Danny Brown in October 2019. She released the promotional single "Halloweenie II: Pumpkin Spice" in October 2019. She co-wrote eight songs, two of which she is featured on, on Brooke Candy's debut album, Sexorcism, which was released in October 2019.

2020–2021: Breakthrough and Demidevil 

Ashnikko co-wrote the song "Boss Bitch" with American rapper Doja Cat, which was included on the Birds of Prey soundtrack, Birds of Prey: The Album. Prior to the COVID-19 pandemic, Ashnikko was scheduled to accompany Doja Cat on her Hot Pink Tour throughout the United States in March 2020 before it was canceled. In March 2020, she released the standalone single "Tantrum". Later that month, she performed "Tantrum" live as part of The Faders Digital Fader Fort event. "Cry", featuring Canadian musician Grimes, was then released in June 2020, alongside an animated music video. The song's music video was nominated for "Best Pop Video - UK" at the 2020 UK Music Video Awards. Following this, "Daisy" was released in July 2020, and a music video for the song was released in collaboration with Beats by Dre and TikTok a month later. "Daisy" became Ashnikko's breakthrough hit, charting internationally in countries including Australia, Belgium and the United Kingdom. It reached a peak of number 24 on the UK Singles Chart, becoming her first charting and first top 40 hit in the UK. Ashnikko's third Halloween song, "Halloweenie III: Seven Days", was released in October 2020. She was nominated for Best Push Act at the 2020 MTV Europe Music Awards.

"Cry" and "Daisy" both appear on Ashnikko's debut mixtape, Demidevil, which was released on January 15, 2021. "Deal with It" featuring Kelis and "Slumber Party" featuring Princess Nokia served as the third and fourth singles from the mixtape, respectively. In support of the mixtape, Ashnikko announced The Demidevil Tour, which is set to take place in October 2021, with shows in North America, the UK, and Ireland.

More recently, Ashnikko co-wrote the song "Frost" released on May 31, 2021, which figures in Korean boy band Tomorrow X Together – TXT's album The Chaos Chapter: Freeze and its repackage album The Chaos Chapter: Fight or Escape released on August 17, 2021. She sent the hyper-pop, trap-based song over to TXT in English. The song was then translated to Korean.

2022-present: Hiatus, Weedikiller and world tour 

After a year hiatus since the release of the two-side singles "Panic Attacks In Paradise" and "Maggots" on September 29, 2021, Ashnikko released her first single "You Make Me Sick!" on February 8, 2023. On March 1, she announced the release of her debut album Weedkiller for June 2, the Weedkiller World Tour across Asia, Oceania, North America and Europe and will start on March 24 in Japan and end on December 11 in the UK, and the second single from the album "Worms", which was released a day later.

Artistry 
Ashnikko's musical style has been described by critics as a fusion of several genres, including pop, indie pop, rock, alt-pop, hip hop, bubblegum pop, indie rock, punk, and electropop. She described her style of music as "angry, punk, hip hop, sad-girl-feminist, bubblegum, poo-poo music", and has clarified that her music is not intended to be comedic or parody-based.

Ashnikko is known for her Tokyo-inspired street fashion. She is also known for her unique blue hair, which is originally brown. In the video for "Nice Girl" and some of her early vlogs, her hair is pastel green. Her hair in the "Daisy" music video is yellow, pink, and red.

Ashnikko has cited her musical influences as M.I.A., Gwen Stefani, Lil' Kim, Björk, Paramore, Avril Lavigne, Nicki Minaj, Missy Elliott, Dolly Parton, Janis Joplin, and Joan Jett, and has stated that her favorite song is "Bossy" by Kelis. She has also listed Doja Cat, Grimes, Tierra Whack, Rico Nasty, Princess Nokia, Kim Petras, and Charli XCX as her "peers" and artists she "really respects".

Personal life 
Ashnikko stated on Twitter in June 2019 that she is bisexual and later clarified in a 2020 interview that she is pansexual. In May 2021, Ashnikko came out as genderfluid on Twitter, saying that "i just didn't feel ready to tell the internet yet but i guess now's a good time since everyone's doing a dissection into my sexuality and gender identity". She uses she/her and they/them pronouns.

In July 2020, while discussing the meaning behind the lyrics of her single "Daisy", she said that while her family practices Christianity, she does not.

In December 2021, Ashnikko began dating fellow singer Arlo Parks.

Advocacy 
Ashnikko has described herself as a feminist and has attributed discovering intersectional feminism through microblogging website Tumblr as a teenager as a turning point for her. She has been vocal about a range of social justice issues, having spoken out about the commercialization of feminism in November 2019, while advocating for victims of police brutality through social media.

Discography 

Weedkiller (2023)

Awards and nominations

Tours

Headlining
 The Demidevil Tour (2021)
 Weedkiller The World Tour (2023)

References

External links

 
 

1996 births
Living people
21st-century American rappers
21st-century American women singers
21st-century American LGBT people
21st-century women rappers
American expatriates in Estonia
American expatriates in Latvia
American expatriates in the United Kingdom
American hip hop singers
American indie pop musicians
American indie rock musicians
American LGBT singers
American punk rock singers
American women singer-songwriters
Feminist rappers
LGBT feminists
LGBT people from North Carolina
LGBT rappers
Non-binary musicians
Pansexual non-binary people
Pansexual musicians
Parlophone artists
People from Guilford County, North Carolina
Pop rappers
Rappers from North Carolina
Singer-songwriters from North Carolina
Warner Records artists
Genderfluid people